The 2015–16 season was the season of competitive football (soccer) in Cape Verde.

Diary of the season
João Lopes Rodrígues became chairman of Solpontense
September 4 - Daniel de Jesus became president of CS Mindelense succeeding Adilson Nascimento
September 12 - Orlando Delgago became president of Rosariense Clube, a club in the Santo Antão North Zone's Second Division
September 16 - Desportivo de Assomada celebrated its 25th anniversary of the foundation of the club
September 23:
Portuguese coach Joel de Castro who was coaching Spartak d'Aguadinha started to coach Boavista FC Praia
Jaime Veiga became coach of Spartak d'Aguadinha
October:
David Brito succeeded Nelson Figueiredo as coach of FC Juventude in Sal
Janito Carvalho was again coach of Sporting Clube da Praia
Domingo Gomes succeeded Djulinano Santos as president of Sport Clube Verdun of Sal, Dujlinano became manager of FC Juventude of Sal
Marineida da Graça became the first female president of FC Ultramarina
October 2 - Lúcio Antunes was transferred from Progresso Associação do Sambizanga, an Angolan football club to Académico do Aeroporto as coach, he succeeded Carlos Moniz
October 24:
Amarildo Baessa was elected president of Cutelinho
Mario Pinto became coach of Botafogo FC of Fogo
October 29 - Djo Bracó succeeded Osvaldinho Rocha as president of Onze Estrelas
November 6 - Osvaldinho Silva Lopes succeeded Elísio Silva as coach or president
November 7:
The 2015-16 Fogo Island League begins
Mindelense won their third title for the  São Vicente SuperCup after defeating Amarante
November 13 - the 2015-16 Santiago Island League (South) begins
November 15 - Both Académica and Sporting Praia took the number one lead in  the Santiago South Premier Division with 3 points each
November 22 -  Eugénio Lima took the number one spot for Santiago South with 4 points
November 29 - Celtic da Praia defeated Os Garridos 1-3 and took the number one spot for Santiago South with 7 points
December 3 - GDRC Fiorentina announced to return after a three-year absence from the Southern Santo Antão Island League to financial concerns their first match of the season was against Lajedos
December 12
The 2015-16 Santiago Island League (North) begins, the Second Division was restored after a nearly ten-year hiatus
Gaming schedules for the Santo Antão North Zone's new season finished
December 13:
Académica da Praia took the number one position and kept it for the next seven rounds for Santiago South
Académica do Porto Novo won the Santo Antão South Zone Super Cup title for the season
Late-December: Académica do Porto Novo won their first and only title for the first edition of the Santo Antão Island Super Cup 
January 9
the 2015-16 Brava Island League begins
the 2015-16 Santo Antão Island League (South) begins, one of the first matches of the season was Fiorenta and Lajedos, Fiorentina's next match in over three years
Mid-January - The first ever single island Santo Antão Cup took place
January 16
2015-16 Boa Vista Island League begins
2015-16 Santo Antão Island League (North) begins
2015-16 São Nicolau Island League begins
2015-16 São Vicente Island League begins
January 17 - Batuque defeated Amarante 2-0 and took the number one lead for the São Vicente Premier Division for a week
January 23 - the 2015-16 Maio Island League begins
January 31 - CD Falcões do Norte defeated Salamansa FC 0-4 and took the number one spot for São Vicente for two weeks
February 6:
2015-16 Sal Island League begins with two additional clubs totalling eight
FC Derby defeated SC Farense 1-3 and took the number one spot for a week for São Vicente with 5 points
February 13:
Boavista Praia took the number one spot for Santiago South with 28 points
Mindelense took the number one spot for São Vicente for the rest of the season
February 20 - ADESBA took the number one spot for Santiago South for just four rounds
March 20–24: No sports competitions due to the Parliamentary elections that took place
March 25 - Desportivo Praia defeated Vitória da Praia 4-0 and took the number one spot for Santiago South for a week
March 27: Brava Island League: Juventude Furna defeated Benfica 0-16 and made it the highest scoring match of any of the island leagues for the season in the nation
April 3:
Académica Fogo defeated São Lourenço 1-12 and made it the highest scoring match of the Fogo Premier Division and was second of any of the island leagues for the season in the nation
Sporting Praia took the number one spot for Santiago South for a week
April 10 - Desportivo Praia retook the number one spot for Santiago South for a week
April 11 - Sporting Clube da Brava won their third consecutive and recent title for Brava and qualified into the national championships
April 16 - Mindelense's record of 34 matches without a loss at the regional championships ended as the club lost to Amarante 2-0, their next loss in two years
April 17:
Sinagoga, the village's club located between Ribeira Grande and Paul was listed as regional champions for the first time
Sporting Praia regained the number one spot for Santiago South for a week
April 20 - ABC de Patim returned to the regional premier division in the following season after winning the promotional final match
April 21 - Académico do Aeroporto won their fourteenth title for Sal and their second consecutive title and again qualified into the national championships
April 23:
Académica do Porto Novo's approximate 50 match (5 year) record without a loss at the regional championships finished as the club lost to Marítimo 2-0, also it was a record numbering about 60 combining with the South Zone's cup and super cup matches and not with the single Santo Antão Cup as they lost one match.  At home matches, the record continues.
Académica do Porto Novo won their tenth title for Southern Santo Antão (eleventh of a combined total with the former Santo Antão Championships) and their sixth consecutive, one of around six clubs to win six consecutive titles in history of any of the regional leagues in Cape Verde, the club qualified into the national championships
April 24:
Mindelense's long record without a home loss at the regionals numbering 18 in the regionals came to an end after losing to Derby 0-1.
Desportivo Praia retook the number one spot for Santiago South and held it for the last three weeks of the season
CS Mindelense won their record forty-eight title and qualified into the national championships
Sinagoga won their first and only title for Northern Santo Antão and qualified into the national championships for the first time
Vulcânicos won their ninth and recent title and qualified into the national championships
Lajedos was the first cup winner of the single Santo Antão Island Cup
Académica do Porto Novo won their fourth consecutive cup title for Santo Antão South
Paulense won their cup title for Santo Antão North
May 1:
Sport Sal Rei Club won their ninth title for Boa Vista, their next in five years and qualified into the national championships
Salamansa FC won their first and only cup title for São Vicente
May 4: Original date of the Santiago South Cup finals, it was rescheduled to April 15, 2017 and GDRC Delta won their only cup title for Santiago South
May 7 - SC Atlético won their seventh title for São Nicolau and qualified into the national championships
May 8 - All qualifiers into the national championship listed including Académico do Aeroporto, winner of Sal, Desportivo da Praia won their regional title in 26 years, the first as the divided Santiago South Zone, Desportivo returned in four years, their last entry was a second place club as the 2013 island champion Sporting was also national champion in 2012, Varandinha, champion of Santiago North competed for the first time and Académico 83 of Maio
May 13 - A day before the national championships started, the match between Desportivo Praia and Varandinha was rescheduled to June 1 due to some rivalry
May 14 - The National Championships begun
June 1: Originally for May 15, the rescheduled Desportivo Praia-Varandinha match took place and Varandinha defeated that club 1-3
June 4: Mindelense defeated Sal Rei 5-2 and made it the highest scoring match of the season
June 12 - Regular season ended and Mindelense, Derby and Académica Porto Novo qualified into the semis, also Varandinha qualified for the first time
June 18 - Playoffs began
June 25: With a total of six goals scored in two matches between Mindelense and Varandinha, Mindelense became the first of two clubs to qualify for the finals
June 26: Académica Porto Novo scored the first two goals in the first half of the second leg before Derby did in the second half, Académica Porto Novo qualified into the finals under the away goals rule
July 2: The finals began, and was the last finals match featuring two clubs from the same island chain, Académica Porto Novo defeated Mindelense 0-1
July 9 - The second leg of the finals began and was the last finals matches at the championships, Mindelense defeated Académica 0-1, as each had a total of a goal each, it went into extra time and then the penalty shootouts where Mindelense won 4-5 and claimed a record twelfth title and won four consecutive titles, the last club who won four consecutive national titles was Sporting Praia.

Final standings

Cape Verdean Football Championships

Two number one clubs finished first and were FC Derby (of Group A) and CS Mindelense (of Group), Derby had a draw and Mindelense had two, neither had any losses, Derby scored 8 and Mindelense scored 11, along with GD Varandinha for the first time and Académica do Porto Novo.  Mindelense and Académica do Porto Novo (on away goals) advanced while Varandinha and Derby lost.  In four years, Mindelense again competed with Académica do Porto Novo and a goal in each of the two matches, second consecutive time that both clubs had the same goal totals, again Mindelense won 4-3 in penalty kicks in the last match and claimed their twelfth and recent national title.

Group A

Group B

Final Stages

Island or regional competitions

Regional Championships

Regional Cups

Regional Super Cups
The 2015 champion winner played with a 2015 cup winner (when a club won both, a second place club competed).

Regional Opening Tournaments

Transfer deals

Summer-Fall transfer window
The September/October transfer window runs from the end of the previous season in September up to mid-October.
 Kelvi (Kelvi Lévi Lopes) from Académica Praia to Sporting Praia
 Moisés Lopes from Boavista to Académica Praia
 M.Teixeira from Travadores to Desportivo Praia
 Maldini from Travadores to Desportivo Praia
 Rodi from  Poli Timişoara to Sporting Praia
 Xibaka from CS Mindelense to Boavista Praia
 Ezeijofor Ezenwa from Travadores to Celtic Praia

See also
2015 in Cape Verde
2016 in Cape Verde
Timeline of Cape Verdean football

Notes

References

 
2015 in association football
2016 in association football